Brachypodella is a genus of gastropods belonging to the family Urocoptidae.

The species of this genus are found in Northern and Central America.

Species

Species:

Brachypodella antiperversa 
Brachypodella bourguignatiana 
Brachypodella britoi

References

Urocoptidae
Gastropod genera